Keep Running the Melody is a song by Spanish DJ Wally Lopez, featuring vocals by Canadian/Jamaican singer Kreesha Turner. The song was written by Eritza Laues, Angel David Lopez Alvarez & Ian Alec Harvey Dench.
The track premiered May 18, 2012, after a series of previews being released onto Lopez's YouTube channel, alongside a new mix of the track, titled the "Wally Dub Mix". This version has of yet not been released onto iTunes, however it has been released online for free download, along with other mixes of the track.

Music video
A music video for the song is set to be released June 29, 2012. A preview clip from the video was released online on June 22, 2012.

Track listing

Original Mix

References

2012 songs
Kreesha Turner songs
EMI Records singles